The 2012 Alabama Hammers season was the second season for the professional indoor football franchise and their first in the Professional Indoor Football League (PIFL).

The team played their home games under head coach Marty Hammond at the Von Braun Center in Huntsville, Alabama. The Hammers finished 3–9, failing to qualify for the playoffs.

Schedule
Key:

Regular season
All start times are local to home team

Roster

Division standings

References

External links
2012 results

Alabama Hammers
Alabama Hammers
Alabama Hammers